Chic-a-Go-Go is a public-access television cable television children's dance show that airs on Chicago Access Network Television (CAN-TV). The show bills itself as "Chicago's Dance Show for Kids of All Ages".

Show description

The show invites members of the public to participate in tapings at CAN-TV studios.  A typical episode features dancing to prerecorded music, as well as musical guests lip syncing to their own songs. Each show is hosted by Jake Austen, who portrays Ratso, a teenage puppet rat, and Mia Park as human sidekick Miss Mia.

Among the show's regular features are the "El Train Line" (based on [[Soul Train|Soul Train'''s]] "Soul Train Line"), the "Fantasy Dance" (which features dancers in front of a green screen), and videotaped interviews with guests.

History and influences
Austen got the idea for the show when he published a story in his magazine Roctober about Kiddie-a-Go-Go, an all-kids dance show produced in Chicago between 1963 and 1970. Austen and Stewart met the show's creators, Jack and Elaine Mulqueen, and were inspired to complete a certification course that would allow them to use the facilities of Chicago Access Corporation. They shot the first episodes of the show in March 1996.

In addition to Kiddie-a-Go-Go, the show is influenced by well-known dance shows such as Soul Train, American Bandstand, and Solid Gold.

In the 2004 movie The Big Bounce, Morgan Freeman's character is seen watching the show.

Artists who have appeared on Chic-a-Go-Go

| width="25%" align="left" valign="top" style="border:0"|
Aaron "Spacecat" Ackerson
Acid Mothers Temple
Hasil Adkins
American Dream
Agent Orange
Alejandro Escovedo
An Horse
Annie Peacenik
Anti-Flag
ANTiSEEN
Fred Armisen
A Vague Sound
Azita
Baby Teeth
The Baltimores
Beck
Pedro Bell
Jello Biafra
Big Buildings
Bird Names
Blue Cheer
Bobby Conn
Brilliant Pebbles
Built to Spill
Paul Burlison
Busy Kids
Butthole Surfers
Califone
The Cannanes
Neko Case
Catfish Haven
The Cave Dwellers
Cheap Trick
Chips for the Poor
The Coctails
Bobby Conn
Country Teasers
Cozy
Crass
The Cramps
Flesh Panthers
The Creation
Cynthia Plaster Caster
Dan Deacon
Danielson Famile
Dead Kennedys
Deerhunter
The Dictators
The Dishes
The Dismemberment Plan
DJ Assault
Edgar Allan Ectoplasm
Electric Six (The Wildbunch)
| width="25%" align="left" valign="top" style="border:0"|
Emperor Penguin
Environmental Encroachment
ESHAM
Essex Chanel
Everlast
The Ex
Farm Team
Perry Farrell
Fishboy
The Flying Luttenbachers
Frank Black
French Kicks
Edith Frost
Fugazi
Ezra Furman
GAR GAR
Germs
Godspeed You! Black Emperor
Golden Birthday
Guitar Wolf
GZA
Joe Sepi
Leslie Hall
Neil Hamburger
The Hamburglars
Hanson
Hawnay Troof
Thee Headcoats
HiFi Superstar
The Hives
Kelly Hogan
Honey Blo
Hunx and His Punx
Hunger Strike Riot
Hyper Viper
Iceage
Cordell Jackson
Daniel Johnston
Jollys
Juiceboxxx
Jumpsuit
Ernie K-Doe
King Krule
JC Brooks & the Uptown Sound
The Jesus Lizard
Kim
King Diamond
Local H
The Lemons, (Chicago)
Bob Log III
Loraxx
The M's
| width="25%" align="left" valign="top" style="border:0"|
Mac DeMarco
Magic Slim
Mahjongg
Make Overs
Liz Mandeville
M.O.T.O.
Masked Intruder
Matmos
Meat Puppets
Metalmags
Misfits
Momus
Monotonix
Monotrona
The Mooney Suzuki
Arnold "Gatemouth" Moore
Rudy Ray Moore
Motörhead
Mucca Pazza
Naked & Shameless
Names Divine
The New Pornographers
The New Rob Robbies
Calvin Newborn
Mr. Quintron
No Monster Club
Nobunny
Number Nine
The Nurse Novels
One Happy Island
OK Go
Orange Iguanas
Oreaganomics
Panacea Pussycat
Parquet Courts
Pataphysics
Pere Ubu
Joe Pickett and Nick Prueher
Plack Blague
Plain White T's
The Pretty Things
Archer Prewitt
? and the Mysterians
Marky Ramone
Rap Master Maurice
Recent Photo
Texas Terri
The Romeros
Room 101
Rebirth Brass Band
The Revelettes
The Residents
Ruby Keeler
Rev. Terry Rice
Samwell
| width="25%" align="left" valign="top" style="border:0"|
The Sea and Cake
The Scissor Girls
Screaming Females
Shannon and the Clams
Shellac
The Shirelles
Shonen Knife
Sid Yiddish
Sleater-Kinney
Sleepwalk
Slint
The Slits
The Smith Westerns
Patti Smith
The Smugglers
Snax
Snoop Dogg
Sonic Youth
Soul Coughing
Spoon
Sputnik Kaputnik
Stereolab
Stereo Total
The Stolen Minks
Iggy & the Stooges
Stroby Alliance
Los Straitjackets
Super Minotaur
Loto Ball Show
Swamp Dogg
Le Tigre
Lightning Bolt
Sally Timms
Todd Bowie
Tortoise
Trans Am
Tutu and the pirates
Tub Ring
TV on the Radio
Ty Segall
Twin Peaks
Vanilla Ice
Very Truly Yours
Wesley Willis
X
XBXRX
Yo La Tengo
Youth Lagoon
Andrew W.K.
William Sides Atari Party
Andre Williams
Zolar X
The Sweeps
The Honky Punks
The Reverend Terry Rice

See alsoKiddie-a-Go-GoSoul TrainAmerican BandstandSolid GoldPancake MountainYo Gabba Gabba!''

References

External links
 
 Chic-a-Go-Go site
 Chic-a-Go-Go YouTube channel

Dance television shows
Local music television shows in the United States
American public access television shows
1996 American television series debuts
1990s American children's television series
2000s American children's television series
Chicago television shows
American television shows featuring puppetry